Roger Federer's 2014 tennis  season officially began on 30 December 2013 with the start of the 2014 Brisbane International. This season was a resurgent season for Federer after a poor 2013 season. Before the start of the season Federer appointed Stefan Edberg as his coach and he also changed racquets for the first time, moving on from his longtime frame of 90 square inches to a 97 square inch frame. Federer reached a total of 11 finals, the most since his 2007 season. One of those finals included the Wimbledon final, his first major final since he won Wimbledon in 2012. After winning Shanghai, Federer returned to No. 2 in the world for the first time since May 2013. He also won the Davis Cup for the first time. Federer ended the year at No. 2 with 5 titles and with the most match wins since 2006.

Year summary

Australian Open and early hard court season

Brisbane International
Federer opened his season at the Brisbane International in Brisbane. His first match was in the second round against Jarkko Nieminen of Finland. Though Nieminen challenged Federer in the first set with some aggressive play, Federer ultimately won the first set and went on to win the next set, and the match, handily, continuing his undefeated record against Nieminen. He next played Marinko Matosevic of Australia in the quarterfinals and swept him in straight sets under an hour, allowing only two games to Matosevic. Federer next played Jérémy Chardy of France, whom he had defeated in doubles earlier in the tournament, for the first time in singles in the semifinals. Federer won the first set after breaking Chardy, but Chardy matched Federer in the second set, forcing a tiebreak during which Chardy pulled away from Federer to even the match. The third set looked to be close, but Federer found a break near the end of the set and closed out the match in just under two hours. Lleyton Hewitt won in the final against Federer.

Australian Open
Federer's next contest was the men's singles event of the 2014 Australian Open in Melbourne. His appearance at the 2014 Australian Open marked a record-breaking 57 straight Grand Slam appearances. He finished in the semifinals last year, losing to Andy Murray in five sets. Federer was the sixth seed in the tournament, and began his tournament by playing Australian wildcard James Duckworth in the first round, breaking him four times en route to a straight-sets win. He then played Blaž Kavčič of Slovenia in the second round. Federer swept through the first two sets, but errors in the third set allowed Kavčič to force a tiebreak, which Federer won to close out the match. Federer broke him six times in total and won seven of the last eight points in the tiebreak to win his seventieth match in Melbourne. Federer played Teymuraz Gabashvili of Russia in the third round for the first time in six years. He saved five break points and broke Gabashvili's serve five times en route to a straight-sets victory. Federer played Jo-Wilfried Tsonga of France in the fourth round, and won in straight sets. Federer found breaks in each set, including one at the beginning of the first set, and dictated at the net, using aggressive play to keep Tsonga at bay. With his win, Federer reached his eleventh consecutive Australian Open quarterfinal, and has now reached 41 Grand Slam quarterfinals, tying the all-time record held by Jimmy Connors. Federer faced Andy Murray in the quarter-finals and defeated him in four sets after missing several break opportunities and squandering two match points in the third set tiebreak. Federer lost to Rafael Nadal in the semifinals, in straight sets.

Davis Cup World Group 1R
Federer would make a shocking announcement stating that he would participate for Switzerland in the World Group, his first time doing so since 2012. He along with compatriots Stanislas Wawrinka, Marco Chiudinelli and Michael Lammer would help Switzerland defeat Serbia, defeating Ilija Bozoljac in his first round rubber. Federer's win would help Switzerland advance to play Kazakhstan in the Quarterfinals beating Serbia 3–2.

Dubai Tennis Championships

After playing in the Davis Cup Federer took a three-week break and returned to competition at the Dubai Tennis Championships. Federer won his opening match against Benjamin Becker in the opening round with ease, and faced Radek Štěpánek in the second round. After a solid first set by Federer, Štěpánek tied the match after winning the second-set tiebreak. Federer then climbed out of a three-game deficit in the third set, winning five straight games to seal the match. In the quarterfinals, Federer played his first match against Lukáš Rosol of the Czech Republic. After having his serve broken in the first game, he won the next six games to clinch the first set and held his serve in the second to win the match in straight sets in just under an hour. Federer faced defending champion Novak Djokovic in the semifinals, and dropped the first set to Djokovic. After a rain delay in the second set, Federer converted breaks in the second and third sets against Djokovic and won his first match against Djokovic in 18 months. This was also the first time he had beaten Djokovic after dropping the first set. Federer then played Tomáš Berdych, who had beaten him in the semifinals last year. The two exchanged breaks in the first, but Berdych secured another break and won the first set. In the second set, Berdych broke Federer again, but Federer took advantage of errors on Berdych's part to get two breaks and level the match at one set all. Federer claimed a crucial break in a tighter third set, and held the lead to win in just under two hours. Federer won a record sixth Dubai title and won his 78th career title, surpassing John McEnroe for the third-most titles won in the Open Era. The win also ensured that he would continue his streak of winning at least one title per year since 2001.

Indian Wells Masters
Federer next played at the Indian Wells Masters in Indian Wells. After a bye in the first round, Federer played Frenchman Paul-Henri Mathieu, and defeated him in straight sets, winning three break points and a second-set tiebreak. He then played Dmitry Tursunov of Russia in the third round. Federer and Tursunov both won two break points against each other, and Tursunov forced tiebreaks in both the first and second sets. Federer, however, won both of the tiebreaks, taking the match in straight sets. He then met Tommy Haas in the fourth round, and won in straight sets, though Haas kept the match close. Federer played Kevin Anderson of South Africa in the quarterfinals. In the first set, Anderson held off Federer on numerous break point opportunities, but Federer broke in the last game of the set to take the lead. Federer then jumped out to a five-game lead in the second set, and won the match in straight sets. Federer then played first-time semifinalist Alexandr Dolgopolov in the semifinals, and raced through the match, winning four break points and allowing Dolgopolov only four games en route to a win in just over an hour. Federer was narrowly defeated in the final by Novak Djokovic in a final set tie-break.

Miami Open
Federer next played the Miami Open in Miami. He played Ivo Karlović in the second round after a bye in the first round. Federer broke Karlović early in the first set and, after holding to take the lead, defeated Karlović in the second-set tiebreak. Federer then cruised into the quarterfinals, beating Thiemo de Bakker and Richard Gasquet both in straight sets. However, in one of the tour's biggest upsets, Kei Nishikori would improve his head-to-head record against Federer to 2–1, beating Federer in three sets. Unfortunately, Nishikori would retire before his semifinal match, most probably sustaining a groin injury during their quarterfinal meeting.

Davis Cup World Group QF
Switzerland played against Kazakhstan in the quarterfinals. This was the first time Federer had played in the Davis Cup quarterfinals since 2004. Federer defeated Mikhail Kukushkin to equalize the tie at 1-1. Federer and Wawrinka then played doubles but fell in four sets. After Wawrinka brought the Swiss to parity at 2-2, Federer was tasked with winning the first deciding fifth live rubber of his career. Federer led the Swiss to a 3–2 victory by defeating Andrey Golubev in straight sets.

Spring clay court season and French Open

Monte-Carlo Masters
Federer began his clay season with a wildcard entry into the Monte-Carlo Masters. Federer experienced great success during his second and third round meetings against Radek Štěpánek and Lukas Rosol, defeating both in straight sets. He then defeated Jo-Wilfried Tsonga from a set down for the first time in his career, in a match where he failed to convert any of his first 15 break points. He ousted world No. 2 and defending champion Novak Djokovic in the semifinals, ending the Serb's unbeaten run in Masters 1000 tournaments dating back to the 2013 Shanghai Masters. He lost his fourth Monte Carlo final, this time to compatriot Stanislas Wawrinka.

Madrid Open
Federer was seeded 4th, but withdrew from the tournament to be with his pregnant wife, Mirka. On May 6, he announced that they became parents to twins again, this time boys – Leo and Lenny.

Italian Open
Federer next played in Rome at the Italian Open, where he was a three-time finalist, including in 2013.  He was seeded 4th.
He suffered a shock defeat to Jérémy Chardy in a final-set tiebreaker in the second round, after having match point. The loss was the first time in 2014 that Federer had failed to match or better his result at a tournament compared to the previous season.

French Open
Federer started his 2014 French Open campaign with a comfortable straight sets victory over Lukas Lacko. He followed this up with another straight sets victory over Argentine qualifier Diego Sebastien Schwartzman in the second round. Federer defeated Dimitry Tursunov in the third round in four sets, in their first meeting on a clay court. Federer was upset in the fourth round by Ernest Gulbis, who leveled their head-to-head record with a victory in five sets. The loss snapped Federer's streak of nine straight French Open quarterfinals.

Grass court season and Wimbledon

Halle Open
Following a first round bye, Federer came from a set down to defeat Joao Sousa. After receiving a walkover in the quarterfinals, Federer defeated fourth seed Kei Nishikori to reach his ninth singles final at the Halle Open. Federer successfully defended his title and won a record seventh Halle Open singles title, beating Alejandro Falla in the final in two tiebreak sets. It was Federer's 14th grass court title, extending his open era record, and his 79th career singles title.

Wimbledon
Federer dispatched Paolo Lorenzi, Gilles Muller, Santiago Giraldo, and Tommy Robredo without dropping a set or losing serve. In doing so, he reached his 42nd major quarterfinal, surpassing the previous all-time record of 41 set by Jimmy Connors. He defeated compatriot Stan Wawrinka in four sets in the first all-Swiss Wimbledon men's quarterfinal in history, then defeated Milos Raonic in a record 35th major semifinal. This extended Federer's record in Wimbledon semi finals to 9–0, and 27–1 in sets. In the final, he was defeated by Novak Djokovic in an epic five set match.

North American hard court season and the US Open

Canadian Open
Federer would participate in this years Canadian Open for the first time since 2011. The two-time champ was seeded second due to Rafael Nadal's injury and would be given a bye into the second round. Federer would have a speedy dispatch of Canadian wildcard Peter Polansky, advancing to the round of sixteen where he defeated Marin Cilic in a three set thriller match. He went on to beat David Ferrer in the quarter-final in three tight sets. In the semi-final, he defeated Lopez easily in straight sets. In his 37th final at the ATP World Tour Masters 1000 level Federer was defeated by Jo-Wilfried Tsonga and remained one match shy of becoming the first man to win 300 matches at the masters 1000 level.

Cincinnati Masters
Federer was seeded second again due to Rafael Nadal's wrist injury. He played against Canadian Vasek Pospisil in the second round, defeating him in three sets. With that win, he became the first man to win 300 matches at the Masters 1000 level. In the third round, he played against Frenchman Gaël Monfils where he defeated him in three sets. In the quarterfinal, he played Andy Murray, beating him in straight sets after recovering from double-break down in the second set. The victory drew Federer even with Murray head-to-head at 11–11. He easily defeated Milos Raonic in the semifinal with a comfortable straight sets victory over the Canadian. In the final, Federer defeated Spain's David Ferrer in three sets to capture his record sixth Cincinnati crown and 22nd ATP World Tour Masters 1000 title. It was also his 80th ATP singles title. He also improved to a perfect 6–0 in Cincinnati finals and to a 16–0 head-to-head record against the 32-year-old Ferrer and secured third place in the 2014 US Open Series.  Also with the win, Federer qualified for the season-ending championship, securing a return to the ATP World Tour Finals for a record 13th consecutive year.

US Open
Federer was seeded second, following Rafael Nadal's withdrawal due to a right wrist injury, at Flushing Meadows and was looking to win the title for a record sixth time.  He started his bid for an 18th Grand Slam championship crown against Marinko Matosevic with a straight sets victory, his 50th win of the season, and faced off another Australian, Sam Groth, in the second round, where he managed to beat the big-serving player in straight sets despite a few exchanges of breaks.  In the third round, he was tested by the Spaniard Marcel Granollers as he dropped the first set of the tournament but was dominant in the following three sets.  He battled another Spaniard, Roberto Bautista Agut, in the round of sixteen, defeating him in straight sets.  In the quarterfinal, he defeated Frenchman Gaël Monfils, fighting back from a two-set deficit for the ninth time in his career and saving two match points in the fourth set.  Federer then fell in straight sets in his semifinal match to a resurgent Marin Cilic, who went on to win the tournament.  With the loss, it became the first time since the 2005 Australian Open that neither Federer, Nadal, or Djokovic featured in the final.

Davis Cup World Group SF
Switzerland played against Italy in the semifinals. This was the first time Federer had played in the Davis Cup semifinals since 2003. Both Federer and Wawrinka won their respective singles rubbers on the first day against Simone Bolelli and Fabio Fognini in straight sets. Having a 2–0 lead over Italy, Federer elected not to play the doubles rubber where Wawrinka and Marco Chiudinelli lost in five sets. Federer would secure a place in the Davis Cup final with a straight sets victory over Fabio Fognini. Switzerland will next play against France in the Davis Cup finals in November, hoping to improve upon their best Davis Cup result as Finalists in 1992.

Asian swing

Shanghai Masters
In his second round match, Federer beat Argentinian Leonardo Mayer winning in three close sets after being down 2–5 in the third set tiebreak, saving 5 match points, the first two being saved at 4–5 15–40 in the third set, and the other three being saved in the third set tiebreak. He played Spaniard Roberto Bautista Agut and defeated him in straight sets in the third round and went on to beat Frenchman Julien Benneteau in the quarterfinal. He played inspired tennis to beat world No. 1 Novak Djokovic in the semifinals, ending the Serb's 28-match unbeaten run on Chinese soil. He battled Frenchman Gilles Simon in his second Shanghai final, defeated him in two tiebreak sets and collected his 23rd Masters 1000 title of his career. This was the first time Federer had won the Shanghai Masters and the first tournament he had won in China since the Masters Cup in 2007. As a result of his victory Federer passed Rafael Nadal for number two in the world rankings, marking his highest ranking since May 2013.

European indoor season

Swiss Indoors
Federer defeated Gilles Muller in the first round. In the second round Federer came back from a set down to defeat Denis Istomin. In the quarterfinals Federer defeated Grigor Dimitrov in straight sets to reach his twelfth semifinal at the Swiss Indoors. In the semifinals, Federer defeated Ivo Karlović and reached an eleventh final (and ninth consecutive) at the Swiss Indoors, setting an all-time record for the most finals reached at a single tournament. In the finals, Federer defeated David Goffin to win a record 6th title.

Paris Masters
Federer began the tournament with a tight three set victory over Jérémy Chardy, then defeated qualifier Lucas Pouille. His run ended in the quarterfinals, when he lost to a determined Milos Raonic for the first time in seven meetings.

ATP World Tour Finals

Federer began his record-setting thirteenth consecutive year-end championships tournament with straight-sets victories over Milos Raonic and Kei Nishikori in round-robin play. He continued this streak, breezing past Andy Murray, winning his first ever bageled set against him in his 250th indoor court victory.  With this win Federer took a lead in their head-to-head matchup 12–11 for the first time since 2005 when they first met.  He also became the first of the Big Four to win a 6–0 set against all three rivals.  With the win, Federer advanced to the semifinals of the Tour Finals for a record-tying twelfth time. He defeated his friend and compatriot Stan Wawrinka in a highly competitive three-set semifinal, coming from a set down and saving four match points, in order to make his ninth final at the year-end championships. Due to injury, he withdrew before the final; this was only the third time in his career that he had withdrawn from a tournament.

Davis Cup World Group Final
Federer arrived in Lille but was unable to practice for most of the week because of the back injury he suffered at the World Tour Finals just days before. Following Stan Wawrinka's victory in the first rubber, a rusty Federer could not overcome a sensational performance by Gaël Monfils and was defeated in straight sets. Federer and Wawrinka played the doubles rubber against Richard Gasquet and Julien Benneteau and recorded their first win together in doubles since 2011 to give Switzerland a 2–1 lead heading into the final Sunday of the season. Federer played the fourth rubber against Gasquet, who was a late substitution for Jo-Wilfried Tsonga, and emerged victorious to deliver Switzerland its first Davis Cup victory in history.

All matches

Singles matches

|-
| rowspan="5" style="text-align:left; vertical-align:top;"| Brisbane InternationalBrisbane, AustraliaATP World Tour 250Hard, outdoor30 December 2013 – 5 January 2014
| –
| style="background:#afeeee;" | 1R
| Bye
|
|
|
|-
| 1139
| style="background:#afeeee;" | 2R
|  Jarkko Nieminen 
| style="padding-right: .5em; text-align: right" | 39
| bgcolor=98FB98|Win
| 6–4, 6–2
|-
| 1140
| style="background:#ffebdc;" | QF
|  Marinko Matosevic 
| style="padding-right: .5em; text-align: right" | 61
| bgcolor=98FB98|Win
| 6–1, 6–1
|-
| 1141
| style="background:yellow;" | SF
|  Jérémy Chardy 
| style="padding-right: .5em; text-align: right" | 34
| bgcolor=98FB98|Win
| 6–3, 6–7(3–7), 6–3
|-
| 1142
| style="background:thistle;" | F
|  Lleyton Hewitt 
| style="padding-right: .5em; text-align: right" | 60
| style="background:thistle;"| Loss (1)
| 1–6, 6–4, 3–6
|-
! colspan=7 |<noinclude>
|-
| rowspan="6" style="background:#F3E6D7; text-align:left; vertical-align:top;"| Australian OpenMelbourne, AustraliaGrand SlamHard, outdoor13–26 January 2014
| 1143
| style="background:#afeeee;" | 1R
|  James Duckworth 
| style="padding-right: .5em; text-align: right" | 133
| bgcolor=98FB98|Win
| 6–4, 6–4, 6–2
|-
| 1144
| style="background:#afeeee;" | 2R
|  Blaž Kavčič 
| style="padding-right: .5em; text-align: right" | 99
| bgcolor=98FB98|Win
| 6–2, 6–1, 7–6(7–4) 
|-
| 1145
| style="background:#afeeee;" | 3R
|  Teymuraz Gabashvili 
| style="padding-right: .5em; text-align: right" | 79
| bgcolor=98FB98|Win
| 6–2, 6–2, 6–3
|-
| 1146
| style="background:#afeeee;" | 4R
|  Jo-Wilfried Tsonga
| style="padding-right: .5em; text-align: right" | 10
| bgcolor=98FB98|Win
| 6–3, 7–5, 6–4
|-
| 1147
| style="background:#ffebdc;" | QF
|  Andy Murray 
| style="padding-right: .5em; text-align: right" | 4
| bgcolor=98FB98|Win
| 6–3, 6–4, 6–7(6–8), 6–3
|-
| 1148
| style="background:yellow;"  | SF
|  Rafael Nadal 
| style="padding-right: .5em; text-align: right" | 1
| style="background:#FFECB2;" | Loss
| 6–7(4–7), 3–6, 3–6
|-
! colspan=7 |<noinclude>
|-
| rowspan="1" style="background:#ECF2FF; text-align:left; vertical-align:top;"| Davis Cup, World Group First Round   Davis Cup  Hard, indoor  31 January – 2 February 2014
| 1149
| style="background:#afeeee;" | RR
|  Ilija Bozoljac
| style="padding-right: .5em; text-align: right" | 268
| bgcolor=98FB98|Win
| 6–4, 7–5, 6–2
|-
! colspan=7 |<noinclude>
|-
| rowspan="5" style="background:#D4F1C5; text-align:left; vertical-align:top;"| Dubai Duty Free Tennis ChampionshipsDubai, United Arab EmiratesATP World Tour 500Hard, outdoor24 February – 2 March 2014
| 1150
| style="background:#afeeee;" | 1R
|  Benjamin Becker 
| style="padding-right: .5em; text-align: right" | 90
| bgcolor=98FB98|Win
| 6–1, 6–4
|-
| 1151
| style="background:#afeeee;" | 2R
|  Radek Štěpánek
| style="padding-right: .5em; text-align: right" | 48
| bgcolor=98FB98|Win
| 6–2, 6–7(4–7), 6–3
|-
| 1152
| style="background:#ffebdc;" | QF
|  Lukáš Rosol
| style="padding-right: .5em; text-align: right" | 49
| bgcolor=98FB98|Win
| 6–2, 6–2
|-
| 1153
| style="background:yellow;" | SF
|  Novak Djokovic
| style="padding-right: .5em; text-align: right" | 2
| bgcolor=98FB98|Win
| 3–6, 6–3, 6–2
|-
| 1154
| style="background:lime;" | W
|  Tomáš Berdych
| style="padding-right: .5em; text-align: right" | 6
| style="background:lime;"| Win (1)
| 3–6, 6–4, 6–3
|-
! colspan=7 |<noinclude>
|-
| rowspan="7" style="background:#E9E9E9; text-align:left; vertical-align:top;"| BNP Paribas OpenIndian Wells, United StatesATP World Tour Masters 1000Hard, outdoor3–16 March 2014 
| –
| style="background:#afeeee;" | 1R
| Bye
|
|
|
|-
| 1155
| style="background:#afeeee;" | 2R
|  Paul-Henri Mathieu
| style="padding-right: .5em; text-align: right" | 123
| bgcolor=98FB98|Win
| 6–2, 7–6(7–5)
|-
| 1156
| style="background:#afeeee;" | 3R
|  Dmitry Tursunov
| style="padding-right: .5em; text-align: right" | 30
| bgcolor=98FB98|Win
| 7–6(9–7), 7–6(7–2)
|-
| 1157
| style="background:#afeeee;" | 4R
|  Tommy Haas
| style="padding-right: .5em; text-align: right" | 12
| bgcolor=98FB98|Win
| 6–4, 6–4
|-
| 1158
| style="background:#ffebdc;" | QF
|  Kevin Anderson
| style="padding-right: .5em; text-align: right" | 18
| bgcolor=98FB98|Win
| 7–5, 6–1
|-
| 1159
| style="background:yellow;" | SF
|  Alexandr Dolgopolov
| style="padding-right: .5em; text-align: right" | 31
| bgcolor=98FB98|Win
| 6–3, 6–1
|-
| 1160
| style="background:thistle;" | F
|  Novak Djokovic
| style="padding-right: .5em; text-align: right" | 2
| style="background:thistle;"| Loss (2)
| 6–3, 3–6, 6–7(3–7)
|-
! colspan=7 |<noinclude>
|-
| rowspan="5" style="background:#E9E9E9; text-align:left; vertical-align:top;"| Sony Open TennisMiami, United StatesATP World Tour Masters 1000Hard, outdoor17–30 March 2014
| –
| style="background:#afeeee;" | 1R
| Bye
|
|
|
|-
| 1161
| style="background:#afeeee;" | 2R
|  Ivo Karlović 
| style="padding-right: .5em; text-align: right" | 53
| bgcolor=98FB98|Win
| 6–4, 7–6(7–4)
|-
| 1162
| style="background:#afeeee;" | 3R
|  Thiemo de Bakker
| style="padding-right: .5em; text-align: right" | 162 
| bgcolor=98FB98|Win
| 6–3, 6–3
|-
| 1163
| style="background:#afeeee;" | 4R
|  Richard Gasquet
| style="padding-right: .5em; text-align: right" | 9
| bgcolor=98FB98|Win
| 6–1, 6–2
|-
| 1164
| style="background:#ffebdc;" | QF
|  Kei Nishikori
| style="padding-right: .5em; text-align: right" | 21
| style="background:#FFECB2;" | Loss
| 6–3, 5–7, 4–6
|-
! colspan=7 |<noinclude>
|-
| rowspan="2" style="background:#ECF2FF; text-align:left; vertical-align:top;"| Davis Cup, World Group Quarterfinals   Davis Cup  Hard, indoor  4–6 April 2014
| 1165
| style="background:#afeeee;" | RR
|  Mikhail Kukushkin
| style="padding-right: .5em; text-align: right" | 56
| bgcolor=98FB98|Win
| 6–4, 6–4, 6–2
|-
| 1166
| style="background:#afeeee;" | RR
|  Andrey Golubev
| style="padding-right: .5em; text-align: right" | 64
| bgcolor=98FB98|Win
| 7–6(7–0), 6–2, 6–3
|-
! colspan=7 |<noinclude>
|-
| rowspan="6" style="background:#E9E9E9; text-align:left; vertical-align:top;"| Monte-Carlo Rolex MastersMonte Carlo, MonacoATP World Tour Masters 1000Clay, outdoor12–20 April 2014
| –
| style="background:#afeeee;" | 1R
| Bye
|
|
| 
|-
| 1167
| style="background:#afeeee;" | 2R
|  Radek Štěpánek
| style="padding-right: .5em; text-align: right" | 41
| bgcolor=98FB98|Win 
| 6–1, 6–2
|-
| 1168
| style="background:#afeeee;" | 3R
|  Lukas Rosol
| style="padding-right: .5em; text-align: right" | 47
| bgcolor=98FB98|Win
| 6–4, 6–1
|-
| 1169
| style="background:#ffebdc;"| QF
|  Jo-Wilfried Tsonga
| style="padding-right: .5em; text-align: right" | 12
| bgcolor=98FB98|Win
| 2–6, 7–6(8–6), 6–1
|-
| 1170
| style="background:yellow;" | SF
|  Novak Djokovic 
| style="padding-right: .5em; text-align: right" | 2
| bgcolor=98FB98|Win
| 7–5, 6–2
|-
| 1171
| style="background:thistle;" | F
|  Stanislas Wawrinka
| style="padding-right: .5em; text-align: right" | 3
| style="background:thistle;"| Loss (3)
| 6–4, 6–7(5–7), 2–6
|-
! colspan=7 |<noinclude>
|-
| rowspan="2" style="background:#E9E9E9; text-align:left; vertical-align:top;"| Internazionali BNL d'ItaliaRome, ItalyATP World Tour Masters 1000Clay, outdoor12–18 May 2014
| –
| style="background:#afeeee;" | 1R
| Bye
|
|
| 
|-
| 1172
| style="background:#afeeee;" | 2R
|  Jérémy Chardy
| style="padding-right: .5em; text-align: right" | 49
| style="background:#FFECB2;" |Loss
| 6–1, 3–6, 6–7(6–8)
|-
! colspan=7 |<noinclude>
|-
| rowspan="4" style="background:#F3E6D7; text-align:left; vertical-align:top;"| French OpenParis, FranceGrand SlamClay, outdoor26 May – 8 June 2014
| 1173
| style="background:#afeeee;" | 1R
|  Lukáš Lacko
| style="padding-right: .5em; text-align: right" | 87
| bgcolor=98FB98|Win
| 6–2, 6–4, 6–2
|-
| 1174
| style="background:#afeeee;" | 2R
|  Diego Sebastián Schwartzman
| style="padding-right: .5em; text-align: right" | 109
| bgcolor=98FB98|Win
|6–3, 6–4, 6–4
|-
| 1175
| style="background:#afeeee;" | 3R
|  Dmitry Tursunov
| style="padding-right: .5em; text-align: right" | 32
| bgcolor=98FB98|Win
|7–5, 6–7(7–9), 6–2, 6–4
|-
| 1176
| style="background:#afeeee;" | 4R
| Ernests Gulbis
|style="padding-right: .5em; text-align: right" | 17
| style="background:#FFECB2;" | Loss
|7–6(7–5), 6–7(3–7), 2–6, 6–4, 3–6
|-
! colspan=7 |<noinclude>
|-
|rowspan="5" style="text-align:left; vertical-align:top;"| Gerry Weber OpenHalle, GermanyATP World Tour 250Grass, outdoor9–15 June 2014
| –
| style="background:#afeeee;" | 1R
| Bye
|
|
| 
|-
|1177
| style="background:#afeeee;" | 2R
| Joao Sousa
|style="padding-right: .5em; text-align: right" | 44
| bgcolor=98FB98|Win
|6–7(8–10), 6–4, 6–2
|-
| –
|style="background:#ffebdc;" | QF
| Yen-Hsun Lu
|style="padding-right: .5em; text-align: right" | 48
|Walkover
|N/A
|-
|1178
|style="background:yellow;" | SF
| Kei Nishikori  
|style="padding-right: .5em; text-align: right" | 12
| bgcolor=98FB98|Win
|6–3, 7–6(7–4)
|-
|1179
| style="background:lime;" | W
| Alejandro Falla
|style="padding-right: .5em; text-align: right" | 69
| style="background:lime;" |Win (2)
| 7–6(7–2), 7–6(7–3)
|-
! colspan=7 |<noinclude>
|-
| rowspan="7" style="background:#F3E6D7; text-align:left; vertical-align:top;"| Wimbledon ChampionshipsLondon, United KingdomGrand SlamGrass, outdoor23 June – 6 July 2014
| 1180
| style="background:#afeeee;" | 1R
|  Paolo Lorenzi
| style="padding-right: .5em; text-align: right" | 83
| bgcolor=98FB98|Win
| 6–1, 6–1, 6–3
|-
| 1181
| style="background:#afeeee;" | 2R
|  Gilles Müller
| style="padding-right: .5em; text-align: right" | 103
| bgcolor=98FB98|Win
| 6–3, 7–5, 6–3
|-
| 1182
| style="background:#afeeee;" | 3R
|  Santiago Giraldo
| style="padding-right: .5em; text-align: right" | 35
| bgcolor=98FB98|Win
| 6–3, 6–1, 6–3
|-
| 1183
| style="background:#afeeee;" | 4R
|  Tommy Robredo
| style="padding-right: .5em; text-align: right" | 22
| bgcolor=98FB98|Win
| 6–1, 6–4, 6–4
|-
| 1184
| style="background:#ffebdc;" | QF
|  Stan Wawrinka
| style="padding-right: .5em; text-align: right" | 3
| bgcolor=98FB98|Win
| 3–6, 7–6(7–5), 6–4, 6–4
|-
| 1185
| style="background:yellow;"  | SF
|  Milos Raonic
| style="padding-right: .5em; text-align: right" | 9
| bgcolor=98FB98|Win
| 6–4, 6–4, 6–4
|-
| 1186
| style="background:thistle;" | F 
|  Novak Djokovic
| style="padding-right: .5em; text-align: right" | 2
| style="background:thistle;"| Loss (4)
| 7–6(9–7), 4–6, 6–7(4–7), 7–5, 4–6
|-
! colspan=7 |<noinclude>
|-
| rowspan="6" style="background:#E9E9E9; text-align:left; vertical-align:top;"| Rogers CupToronto, CanadaATP World Tour Masters 1000Hard, outdoor4–10 August 2014
| –
| style="background:#afeeee;" | 1R
| Bye
|
|
| 
|-
| 1187
| style="background:#afeeee;" | 2R
|  Peter Polansky
| style="padding-right: .5em; text-align: right" | 129
| bgcolor=98FB98|Win
| 6–2, 6–0
|-
| 1188
| style="background:#afeeee;" | 3R
|  Marin Čilić
| style="padding-right: .5em; text-align: right" | 18
| bgcolor=98FB98|Win
| 7–6(7–5), 6–7(3–7), 6–4
|-
| 1189
| style="background:#ffebdc;" | QF
|  David Ferrer
| style="padding-right: .5em; text-align: right" | 7 
| bgcolor=98FB98|Win
| 6–3, 4–6, 6–3
|-
| 1190
| style="background:yellow;"  | SF
|  Feliciano Lopez
| style="padding-right: .5em; text-align: right" | 25
| bgcolor=98FB98|Win
| 6–3, 6–4
|-
| 1191
| style="background:thistle;" | F 
|  Jo-Wilfried Tsonga
| style="padding-right: .5em; text-align: right" | 15
| style="background:thistle;"| Loss (5)
| 5–7, 6–7(3–7)
|-
! colspan=7 |<noinclude>
|-
| rowspan="6" style="background:#E9E9E9; text-align:left; vertical-align:top;"| Western & Southern OpenCincinnati, United StatesATP World Tour Masters 1000Hard, outdoor11–17 August 2014
| –
| style="background:#afeeee;" | 1R
| Bye
| 
|
| 
|-
| 1192
| style="background:#afeeee;" | 2R
|  Vasek Pospisil
| style="padding-right: .5em; text-align: right" | 46
| bgcolor=98FB98|Win
| 7–6(7–4), 5–7, 6–2
|-
| 1193
| style="background:#afeeee;" | 3R 
|  Gaël Monfils
| style="padding-right: .5em; text-align: right" | 22
| bgcolor=98FB98|Win
| 6–4, 4–6, 6–3
|-
| 1194
| style="background:#ffebdc;" | QF
|  Andy Murray 
| style="padding-right: .5em; text-align: right" | 9
| bgcolor=98FB98|Win
| 6–3, 7–5
|-
| 1195
| style="background:yellow;"  | SF
|  Milos Raonic
| style="padding-right: .5em; text-align: right" | 7
| bgcolor=98FB98|Win
| 6–2, 6–3
|-
| 1196
| style="background:lime;" | W
|  David Ferrer 
| style="padding-right: .5em; text-align: right" | 6
| style="background:lime;" |Win (3)
| 6–3, 1–6, 6–2
|-
! colspan=7 |<noinclude>
|-
| rowspan="6" style="background:#F3E6D7; text-align:left; vertical-align:top;"| US OpenNew York City, United StatesGrand SlamHard, outdoor25 August – 8 September 2014
| 1197
| style="background:#afeeee;" | 1R
|  Marinko Matosevic
| style="padding-right: .5em; text-align: right" | 76
| bgcolor=98FB98|Win
| 6–3, 6–4, 7–6(7–4)
|-
| 1198
| style="background:#afeeee;" | 2R
|  Sam Groth
| style="padding-right: .5em; text-align: right" | 104
| bgcolor=98FB98|Win 
| 6–4, 6–4, 6–4
|-
| 1199
| style="background:#afeeee;" | 3R
|  Marcel Granollers
| style="padding-right: .5em; text-align: right" | 42
| bgcolor=98FB98|Win
| 4–6, 6–1, 6–1, 6–1
|-
| 1200
| style="background:#afeeee;" | 4R
|  Roberto Bautista Agut
| style="padding-right: .5em; text-align: right" | 19
| bgcolor=98FB98|Win
| 6–4, 6–3, 6–2
|-
| 1201
| style="background:#ffebdc;" | QF
|  Gaël Monfils
| style="padding-right: .5em; text-align: right" | 24
| bgcolor=98FB98|Win
| 4–6, 3–6, 6–4, 7–5, 6–2
|-
| 1202
| style="background:yellow;"  | SF
|  Marin Čilić
| style="padding-right: .5em; text-align: right" | 16
| style="background:#FFECB2;" | Loss
| 3–6, 4–6, 4–6
|-
! colspan=7 |<noinclude>
|-
| rowspan="2" style="background:#ECF2FF; text-align:left; vertical-align:top;"| Davis Cup, World Group Semifinals   Davis Cup  Hard, indoor  12–14 September 2014
| 1203
| style="background:#afeeee;" | RR
|  Simone Bolelli
| style="padding-right: .5em; text-align: right" | 76
| bgcolor=98FB98|Win
| 7–6(7–5),  6–4, 6–4
|-
| 1204
| style="background:#afeeee;" | RR
|  Fabio Fognini
| style="padding-right: .5em; text-align: right" | 17
| bgcolor=98FB98|Win
| 6–2, 6–3, 7–6(7–4)
|-
! colspan=7 |<noinclude>
|-
| rowspan="6" style="background:#E9E9E9; text-align:left; vertical-align:top;"| Shanghai Rolex MastersShanghai, ChinaATP World Tour Masters 1000Hard, outdoor6–12 October 2014
| –
| style="background:#afeeee;" | 1R
| Bye
| 
|
| 
|-
| 1205
| style="background:#afeeee;" | 2R
|  Leonardo Mayer
| style="padding-right: .5em; text-align: right" | 25
| bgcolor=98FB98|Win
| 7–5, 3–6, 7–6(9–7)
|-
| 1206
| style="background:#afeeee;" | 3R
|  Roberto Bautista Agut
| style="padding-right: .5em; text-align: right" | 18
| bgcolor=98FB98|Win
| 6–4, 6–2
|-
| 1207
| style="background:#ffebdc;" | QF
|  Julien Benneteau
| style="padding-right: .5em; text-align: right" | 28
| bgcolor=98FB98|Win
| 7–6(7–4), 6–0
|-
| 1208
| style="background:yellow;"  | SF
|  Novak Djokovic
| style="padding-right: .5em; text-align: right" | 1
| bgcolor=98FB98|Win
| 6–4, 6–4
|-
| 1209
| style="background:lime;" | W
|  Gilles Simon
| style="padding-right: .5em; text-align: right" | 29
| style="background:lime;" |Win (4)
| 7–6(8–6), 7–6(7–2)
|-
! colspan=7 |<noinclude>
|-
| rowspan="5" style="background:#D4F1C5; text-align:left; vertical-align:top;"| Swiss Indoors BaselBasel, SwitzerlandATP World Tour 500Hard, indoor20–26 October 2014
| 1210
| style="background:#afeeee;" | 1R
|  Gilles Müller
| style="padding-right: .5em; text-align: right" | 53
| bgcolor=98FB98|Win
| 6–2, 6–1
|-
| 1211
| style="background:#afeeee;" | 2R
|  Denis Istomin
| style="padding-right: .5em; text-align: right" | 55
| bgcolor=98FB98|Win
| 3–6, 6–3, 6–4
|-
| 1212
| style="background:#ffebdc;" | QF
|  Grigor Dimitrov
| style="padding-right: .5em; text-align: right" | 11
|  bgcolor=98FB98|Win
| 7–6(7–4), 6–2
|-
| 1213
| style="background:yellow;"  | SF
|  Ivo Karlović
| style="padding-right: .5em; text-align: right" | 31
| bgcolor=98FB98|Win 
| 7–6(10–8), 3–6, 6–3
|-
| 1214
| style="background:lime;" | W
|  David Goffin
| style="padding-right: .5em; text-align: right" | 28
| style="background:lime;" |Win (5)
| 6–2, 6–2
|-
! colspan=7 |<noinclude>
|-
| rowspan="4" style="background:#E9E9E9; text-align:left; vertical-align:top;"| BNP Paribas MastersParis, FranceATP World Tour Masters 1000Hard, indoor27 October – 2 November 2014
| –
| style="background:#afeeee;" | 1R
| Bye
| 
|
| 
|-
| 1215
| style="background:#afeeee;" | 2R
|  Jérémy Chardy
| style="padding-right: .5em; text-align: right" | 30
| bgcolor=98FB98|Win 
| 7–6(7–5), 6–7(5–7), 6–4
|-
| 1216
| style="background:#afeeee;" | 3R
|  Lucas Pouille
| style="padding-right: .5em; text-align: right" | 176
| bgcolor=98FB98|Win 
| 6–4, 6–4
|-
| 1217
| style="background:#ffebdc;" | QF
|  Milos Raonic
| style="padding-right: .5em; text-align: right" | 10
| style="background:#FFECB2;" | Loss
| 6–7(5–7), 5–7
|-
! colspan=7 |<noinclude>
|-
| rowspan="5" style="background:#ffffcc; text-align:left; vertical-align:top;"| ATP World Tour FinalsLondon, EnglandATP World Tour FinalsHard, indoor9–16 November 2014
| 1218 
| style="background:#afeeee;" | RR
|  Milos Raonic
| style="padding-right: .5em; text-align: right" | 8
| bgcolor=98FB98|Win 
| 6–1, 7–6(7–0)
|-
| 1219 
| style="background:#afeeee;"  | RR
|  Kei Nishikori
| style="padding-right: .5em; text-align: right" | 5
| bgcolor=98FB98|Win 
| 6–3, 6–2
|-
| 1220 
| style="background:#afeeee;"  | RR
|  Andy Murray
| style="padding-right: .5em; text-align: right" | 6
| bgcolor=98FB98|Win 
| 6–0, 6–1
|-
| 1221
| style="background:yellow;"  | SF
|  Stan Wawrinka
| style="padding-right: .5em; text-align: right" | 4
| bgcolor=98FB98|Win 
| 4–6, 7–5, 7–6(8–6)
|-
| –
| style="background:thistle;"  | F
|  Novak Djokovic
| style="padding-right: .5em; text-align: right" | 1 
| style="background:#FFECB2;" |Withdrew
| N/A
|-
! colspan=7 |<noinclude>
|-
| rowspan="2" style="background:#ECF2FF; text-align:left; vertical-align:top;"| Davis Cup, World Group Final   Davis Cup  Clay, indoor  21–23 November 2014
| 1222
| style="background:#afeeee;" | RR
|  Gaël Monfils
| style="padding-right: .5em; text-align: right" | 19
| style="background:#FFECB2;" | Loss 
| 1–6, 4–6, 3–6
|-
| 1223
| style="background:#afeeee;" | RR
|  Richard Gasquet
| style="padding-right: .5em; text-align: right" | 26
| bgcolor=98FB98|Win 
| 6–4, 6–2, 6–2
|-

|}

Doubles matches

Tournament schedule

Singles schedule
Federer's 2014 singles tournament schedule is as follows:

 Note – for the purposes of year end totals, the four Majors and eight ATP 1000 events must be counted. Then the next six best results will be added, seven if a player makes the Year End Championships. Any other results are not counted in the final tally.

Doubles schedule

Yearly records

Head-to-head matchups
Roger Federer had a  match win–loss record in the 2014 season. The following list is ordered by number of wins:

 Andy Murray 3–0
 Milos Raonic 3–1
 Novak Djokovic 3–2
 Roberto Bautista Agut 2–0
 David Ferrer 2–0
 Richard Gasquet 2–0
 Ivo Karlović 2–0
 Marinko Matosevic 2–0
 Gilles Müller 2–0
 Lukáš Rosol 2–0
 Radek Štěpánek 2–0
 Dmitry Tursunov 2–0
 Jérémy Chardy 2–1
 Gaël Monfils 2–1
 Kei Nishikori 2–1
 Jo-Wilfried Tsonga 2–1
 Stanislas Wawrinka 2–1
 Kevin Anderson 1–0
 Thiemo de Bakker 1–0
 Benjamin Becker 1–0
 Julien Benneteau 1–0
 Tomáš Berdych 1–0
 Simone Bolelli 1–0
 Ilija Bozoljac 1–0
 Grigor Dimitrov 1–0
 Alexandr Dolgopolov 1–0
 James Duckworth 1–0
 Alejandro Falla 1–0
 Fabio Fognini 1–0
 Teymuraz Gabashvili 1–0
 Santiago Giraldo 1–0
 David Goffin 1–0
 Andrey Golubev 1–0
 Marcel Granollers 1–0
 Sam Groth 1–0
 Tommy Haas 1–0
 Denis Istomin 1–0
 Blaž Kavčič 1–0
 Mikhail Kukushkin 1–0
 Lukáš Lacko 1–0
 Feliciano Lopez 1–0
 Paolo Lorenzi 1–0
 Paul-Henri Mathieu 1–0
 Leonardo Mayer 1–0
 Jarkko Nieminen 1–0
 Peter Polansky 1–0
 Vasek Pospisil 1–0
 Lucas Pouille 1–0
 Tommy Robredo 1–0
 Diego Sebastián Schwartzman 1–0
 Gilles Simon 1–0
 João Sousa 1–0
 Marin Cilic 1–1
 Ernests Gulbis 0–1
 Lleyton Hewitt 0–1
 Rafael Nadal 0–1

Finals

Singles: 11 (5 titles, 6 runners-up)

Doubles: 1 (1 runner-up)

Team competitions: 1 (1 title)

Earnings

 Figures in United States dollars (USD) unless noted.

Awards
US Open Sportsmanship Award
Stefan Edberg Sportsmanship Award
Record tenth award in career (fourth consecutive)
ATPWorldTour.com Fans' Favourite
Record twelfth consecutive award in career
Davis Cup Most Valuable Player (shared with Stan Wawrinka)

See also
 2014 ATP World Tour
 2014 Novak Djokovic tennis season
 2014 Andy Murray tennis season
 2014 Rafael Nadal tennis season
 2014 Stanislas Wawrinka tennis season

References

External links
  
 ATP tour profile

2014 Roger Federer tennis season
Federer tennis season
2014 in Swiss tennis
2014 in Swiss sport